Walter Marsden  (1882–1969) was an English sculptor born in Lancashire. He saw active service in the First World War and was awarded the Military Cross.   After the war, like many other sculptors who were also ex-servicemen, he carried out sculptural work on war memorials. Most of these were erected in Lancashire.

Marsden also spoke at speaking engagements about a wide variety of art-related topics. In 1944 he became an instructor at Saint Martin's School of Art and continued teaching until about 1952.

Personal and career life
Walter Marsden, the son of a blacksmith, was born in Church near Accrington in Lancashire, England in 1882.

Starting in 1901 he was an apprentice at the Accrington Brick and Tile Company, whose owners, the McAlpine family, recognised his talent, and encouraged him to study at the Accrington Technical School. From there, Marsden secured a place at the Manchester Municipal College of Art in about 1908. In the 1911 census he gave his occupation as a "clay modeller".

He served as an officer in the Loyal North Lancashire Regiment and was awarded a Military Cross fighting in the Third Battle of Ypres in 1917.  He was later taken prisoner at Cambrai, France and sent to a prisoner of war camp.

After the war he returned to his studies and attended the Royal College of Art between 1919 and 1920 where Édouard Lantéri was one of his instructors.

From 1930 until 1941, when he resigned, Marsden was a member of the Art Workers Guild.  From 1930 to 1941 he was a member of the council of the Royal Society of British Sculptors; He became a Fellow of the Society in 1938 and remained so until 1956. Marsden was a Saint Martin's School of Art temporary instructor starting in 1944. He taught modelling. He was a full-time instructor from 1948 to 1952, his work including teaching sculpture.

Marsden died in August 1969.

Works

Notable work

St Annes on Sea War Memorial
Marsden carried out the sculptural work for the war memorial at St Annes on Sea in Lancashire. The memorial was unveiled on 12 October 1924. One of the figures to the side of the central column is a soldier described as "with twisting body and clenched fist", and the second shows a seated woman holding a baby.

In the book "A Century of Remembrance", a description of the work includes the following: " ... a mother with a child on her knee and the artist wished to convey that she had just been told of her husband's death and in her shock barely noticed the child's pleadings.

War memorials

Other sculpture

Speaking engagements
As part of the Art Workers Guild, Marsdon held numerous speaking engagements between 1933 and 1938. Some of the topics included Medieval art, American sculpture, art criticism, and Pre-Raphaelite sculptors.

Exhibitions
Marsden placed his works in the following exhibitions:
1912 – Multiple works at City of Manchester Art Gallery, Exhibition of Recent Works Executed by Students of the Municipal School of Art.
1915 – 1961 – The Exhibition of the Royal Academy of Arts (Summer Exhibition). He exhibited a total of 25 times throughout this period.
1925 – The Royal Glasgow Institute of the Fine Arts Annual Exhibition
1938 – Palace of Arts Empire Exhibition Scotland.

Gallery

References

1882 births
1969 deaths
English sculptors
English male sculptors
Modern sculptors
Loyal Regiment officers
Recipients of the Military Cross
British Army personnel of World War I
Alumni of the Royal College of Art
People from Accrington
Artists' Rifles soldiers
Academics of Saint Martin's School of Art
20th-century British sculptors